Maningrida, also known as Burarran, is a small family of Australian Aboriginal languages spoken in northern Australia. It includes four languages, none closely related:
 Burarra
 Gurr-goni
 Ndjébbana
 Na'kara

Green established the family by reconstructing the tense–aspect–mood inflections of Proto-Maningrida, and demonstrated common developments that set them apart from other Arnhem languages.

Vocabulary
Capell (1942) lists the following basic vocabulary items for the Maningrida languages. Gunavidji and Bunarra are from Capell (1940).

{| class="wikitable sortable"
! gloss !! Gungorogone !! Gudjälavia !! Gunaidbe !! Burera !! Nagara !! Gunavidji !! Bunarra
|-
! man
| wari || angigälije || angigälije || angigälije || wunigalaia || jiːdja || biːn, ŋanbe
|-
! woman
| gami || gamu || gamu || gamu || nawaɽa || ŋaɽaːm || djulumu
|-
! head
| ŋɔrɔŋɔrɔ || bama || bama || bama || magar || juwuŋga || waːlu
|-
! eye
| mebele || miːbele || miːbele || miːbele || guɽbara || diːli || mil
|-
! nose
| goi || guje || ŋoira || ŋoira || lombara || maŋu || djirdji
|-
! mouth
| ŋaɽa || ŋane || ŋane || ŋana || ŋaɽa || djäbara || lira
|-
! tongue
| ŋaɽa || ŋaɭ || ŋaɭ || ŋaɭa || ŋadabirbir || djäŋɔl || djälaṉ
|-
! stomach
| gɔdjaŋa || ŋaburba || ŋaburba || gɔidjila || gunar || djälema || munda
|-
! bone
| gadjäldi || ŋumama || ŋumama || munmama || namoːma || ida || gidji
|-
! blood
| gɔːlidja || maɳiŋan || maɳiŋan || maɳiŋan, mangaraba || nagumbala || ganbiliːbala || gindjil
|-
! kangaroo
| ganajala || gandejala || gandejala || gonobolo || bälmänindja || gudjbara || wawiri
|-
! opossum
| waraːgun || waːragun || waːragun || waːragun || gurbarabulgaga || malada || djaŋana
|-
! emu
| buɽar ||  ||  || wurbaɳ ||  ||  || 
|-
! crow
| ŋaːridje || wagwag || wagwag || ma'rälgara || wagwag || ŋainjauŋanj || guɽaŋan
|-
! fly
| mɔːji || jumuɖbi || jumuɖbi || mɔːja || namɔːnj || manjimiːndja || ŋurin
|-
! sun
| djinmurga || maɳŋa || maɳŋa || maɳŋa || nabɛn || warwara || djiːla
|-
! moon
| ŋɔlgɔwar || ŋandjireɖa || ŋandjireɖa || ɽangu || wunuŋurabildbilaga || digilgara || jälŋan
|-
! fire
| gunŋudja || bɔːl || bɔːl || bɔːl || nadjɔːga || juwija || waɭu
|-
! smoke
| ginɛlɛ || djolŋo || djolŋo || djolŋo || nawuːra || gɔlɔŋandjara || ŋandjur
|-
! water
| gunmɛnaŋ || djidjurog || bugulo || bugulo || goga || gaːba || ŋaba
|}

Notes

Citations

Sources

 
Indigenous Australian languages in the Northern Territory
Language families